Jan Kouwenhoven (born 16 November 1965 in Sneek) is a sailor from the Netherlands, who represented his country at the 1992 Summer Olympics in Barcelona. Kouwenhoven as crew in the Dutch Men's 470 with his twin brother Ben Kouwenhoven as helmsman took the 16th place. In 1996 Kouwenhoven returned to the Olympics in Savannah, Georgia. Again with his brother, Kouwenhoven took 24th place in the Men's 470.

Professional life
Kouwenhoven holds a Bachelor's degree in Business/Managerial Economics at the Noordelijke Hogeschool Leeuwarden, Leeuwarden. Nowadays Kouwenhoven is account manager for Croon Elektrotechniek (2003 – Present).

Further reading

1992 Olympics (Barcelona)

1996 Olympics (Savannah)

References

Living people
1965 births
Twin sportspeople
People from Sneek
Sportspeople from Friesland
Dutch male sailors (sport)
Sailors at the 1992 Summer Olympics – 470
Sailors at the 1996 Summer Olympics – 470
Olympic sailors of the Netherlands
470 class world champions
World champions in sailing for the Netherlands